My Curse may refer to:

 "My Curse" (song), a song by Killswitch Engage
 "My Curse", a song by The Afghan Whigs from Gentlemen
 "My Curse", a song by The Generators from Excess, Betrayal...And Our Dearly Departed
 "My Curse", a song by H2O from H2O